This article lists the winners and nominees for the NAACP Image Award for Outstanding New Artist.

Winners and nominees
Winners are listed first and highlighted in bold.

1980s

1990s

2000s

2010s

2020s

References

NAACP Image Awards